On the level below municipalities, Bolivia is divided into 1374 cantons (cantones).

 
Subdivisions of Bolivia